John Mākini Kapena (October 2, 1843 – October 23, 1887) was a politician, diplomat and newspaper editor who served many political roles in the Kingdom of Hawaii. He served as Governor of Maui from 1874 to 1876, Minister of Finance from 1876 to 1878 and again from 1883 to 1886, Minister of Foreign Affairs from 1878 to 1880, Postmaster General from 1881 to 1883 and Collector General of Customs from 1886 to 1887. From 1874 to 1875, he accompanied King Kalākaua on his state visit to the United States to negotiate the Reciprocity Treaty of 1875. In 1882, he traveled to Tokyo as Envoy Extraordinary and Minister Plenipotentiary to the Court of Japan to negotiate Japanese immigration to Hawaii.

Early life and family 
Born on October 2, 1843, at Lāhainā, on the island of Maui, Kapena was the son of Mākini and High Chiefess Nāʻawa, a relative of the Kalākaua family. He was adopted under the Hawaiian custom of hānai by his uncle Jonah Kapena, an influential statesman, judge and royal advisor since the reign of King Kamehameha III (r. 1825–1854).

Kapena was educated at the Royal School and later at the Oahu College (now Punahou School). In 1863 he married Emma Aʻalailoa Malo (1846–1886), the only daughter of early Native Hawaiian historian and Christian minister David Malo and his third wife Rebecca Lepeka. Emma was an accomplished musician and composer and served as an attendant of Princess Liliʻuokalani. Emma died unexpectedly from heart disease on April 18, 1886, at the age of 39.

They had one daughter, Alexandrina Leihulu Kapena (1868–1914). On November 5, 1887, Leihulu married Morris Kahai Keohokālole of Maui. She later divorced Keohokālole and married Henry N. Clark after he divorced his wife Emma Dreier. Leihulu owned property on Hawaii and the mainland United States. She died on March 23, 1914, while living in San Francisco, California. She was the last lineal descendant of David Malo. Leihulu died intestate and her estate was disputed between her widower and her two next of kin: Samuel I. Maikai and David U. K. Maikai (grandsons of John William Elliott Maikai). The Hawaii Supreme Court ruled in favor of her widower as her sole heir.

Editor 
In 1870, Kapena became the editor of the newspaper Ke Au Okoa, which ran from 1865 until it merged with Ka Nupepa Kuokoa to become Ka Nupepa Kuokoa Me Ke Au Okoa I Huiia in 1873.

Political career

Earlier career 

During the reign of Kamehameha V (r. 1864–1872), he was commissioned on January 16, 1864, as first lieutenant of the 1st Company of the Yeomanry, a volunteer army regiment in the military of Hawaii. When King Lunalilo ascended to the throne in 1873, Kapena was appointed to a number of political positions. He was appointed to the Board of Education on January 23. He was made a colonel on the king's personal military staff on January 27, and judge of the first circuit court on the island of Oahu, serving in the latter position from April 1, 1873, to July 13, 1874. In July 1873, King Lunalilo and his foreign minister Charles Reed Bishop considered a proposal to cede Pearl Harbor to the United States in exchange for a reciprocity treaty. Although he was in favor of the reciprocity treaty, Kapena gave a speech in front of 1500 Hawaiians at Kaumakapili Church opposing the cessation of Hawaiian territory.

Patronage by Kalākaua 
Lunalilo died without an heir in 1874. In the election that followed, Kapena supported his relative David Kalākaua's candidacy for the vacant throne against Queen Emma, the dowager queen of Kamehameha IV (r. 1855–1864). The choice of Kalākaua by the legislature, and the subsequent announcement, caused a riot at the courthouse. US and British troops were landed, and some of Emma's supporters were arrested.

As part of his first round of political appointments, Kalākaua appointed Kapena as a member of the Privy Council of State and the Governor of Maui, succeeding Paul Nahaolelua, who had resigned the governorship to become Minister of Finance. Kapena served as Governor of Maui from February 23, 1874 until December 15, 1876, when he too resigned the governorship to become Minister of Finance. He was succeeded by William Luther Moehonua as governor. On January 10, 1876, Kapena was appointed by the king to be an official member of the House of Nobles, the upper chamber of the legislature. As a member of the House of Nobles, Kapena served in every legislative session between 1876 and 1886.

From November 17, 1874, to February 15, 1875, Kapena was a member of the Reciprocity Commission and traveled with Kalākaua on his state visit the United States to negotiate the Reciprocity Treaty of 1875.

Kapena held various important cabinet positions during Kalākaua's reign. In 1876, Kapena was appointed to the king's cabinet as Minister of Finance serving alongside three Americans: Henry A. P. Carter, Minister of Foreign Affairs; John Mott-Smith, Minister of the Interior; and Alfred S. Hartwell, Attorney General. He served as the finance minister from December 5, 1876, until Kalākaua demanded the resignation of his entire cabinet in the middle of the night on July 1, 1878. It was widely suspected that Kalākaua's sudden replacement of his cabinet was influenced by American businessman Claus Spreckels, who had refinanced the King's debts the night before in order to secure water rights for his sugarcane plantation on Maui. On July 3, Kapena was appointed as the Minister of Foreign Affairs in a new cabinet with Samuel Gardner Wilder, Minister of the Interior; Simon Kaloa Kaʻai, Minister of Finance; and Edward Preston, Attorney General. Kapena became the first Native Hawaiian to hold the post of foreign minister and the only minister to survive the political shakeup. He held this post from July 3, 1878, to August 14, 1880. During his tenure, the elders (na elemakule) of Tabiteuea in the Gilbert Islands requested annexation to Hawaii. However, Kapena and the king wrote back declining the request due to its political impractically. When the king chose a new cabinet in 1880, Kapena was replaced in the position by the Italian adventurer Celso Caesar Moreno to the vehement opposition of the diplomatic corps and political leaders in Honolulu. Kapena later returned to another cabinet headed by Walter Murray Gibson when he was appointed Minister of Finance for a second term in February 1883 after Kaʻai was removed for "dereliction of ministerial duty." He served as finance minister until June 30, 1886, although Minister of the Interior Charles T. Gulick served as acting finance minister while he was attending the Louisville Exposition in 1885 as Special Commissioner. He was succeeded by Paul P. Kanoa.

He also served as the Postmaster General from 1881 to 1883 and the Collector General of Customs from 1886 to 1887. Other political posts and appointments he held during his political career included Marshal of the Household, member of the Board of Education, Commissioner of Boundaries for Maui, Commissioner of Crown Lands, Commissioner to Codify and Revise Laws and Registrar of Conveyances for Oahu. In 1872, he was appointed as the Envoy Extraordinary and Minister Plenipotentiary to the Court of Japan. Along with his secretary John Lot Kaulukoʻu, he traveled to Japan to negotiate the prospect of Japanese immigration to the Hawaiian Islands. As part of the Education of Hawaiian Youths Abroad governmental program, Kapena also escorted three Hawaiian students to study in Asia. James Kapaa was placed in a school in Canton, China, and James Hakuole and Isaac Harbottle were placed in schools in Japan.

Kapena was decorated with a number of Hawaiian and foreign orders and honors. He was made a Knight Companion of the Royal Order of Kamehameha I, a Grand Officer of the Royal Order of the Crown of Hawaii and a Grand Officer of the Royal Order of Kalākaua. He was also accorded the foreign honors of the Grand Cross of the Order of the Rising Sun of Japan, Grand Officer of the Order of the Cross of Takovo of Serbia, Grand Officer of the Order of the Crown of Prussia, Grand Cross of the Order of the Crown of Japan and the Belgian Red Cross.

Death 
In 1887, Kapena resigned his last political post as Collector General of Customs. Kapena died at his residence at Peleula, Honolulu, on October 23, 1887, at the age of 44.

Kapena's funeral at St. Andrew's Cathedral the following day was attended by the King, members of the royal family, ranking members of the government and Honolulu society, Viscount Torii and T. Fujita of the Japanese legation, the Lodge Le Progres de L'Oceanie and the Hawaiian Lodge No. 21, F. & A. M., where he was a member. His service was conducted entirely in Hawaiian by Anglican Reverend Alexander Mackintosh with Reverend H. H. Gowen also in the chancel. His daughter Leihulu served as the chief mourner. After the service, a funeral procession brought the hearse carrying his casket to Kawaiahaʻo Church where he was buried with Masonic rites. Kapena was buried next to his wife Emma Malo and his hānai father Jonah Kapena in the Kapena family plot. His grave marker reads, "J. M. Kapena Died Oct 23 1887." Other relatives interred there include Umiuimi, David Kalu and Kahoihoi Pahu.

References

Bibliography

External links 

1843 births
1887 deaths
People from Lahaina, Hawaii
Hawaiian nobility
Royal School (Hawaii) alumni
Punahou School alumni
Editors of Hawaii newspapers
Hawaiian Kingdom military officers
Native Hawaiian politicians
Hawaiian Kingdom politicians
Hawaiian Kingdom judges
Governors of Maui
Members of the Hawaiian Kingdom House of Nobles
Members of the Hawaiian Kingdom Privy Council
Hawaiian Kingdom postmasters general
Hawaiian Kingdom Finance Ministers
Hawaiian Kingdom Foreign Ministers
Burials at Kawaiahaʻo Church
Ambassadors of the Hawaiian Kingdom
Recipients of the Royal Order of Kalākaua
Hawaiian Kingdom Anglicans
Recipients of the Order of the Cross of Takovo
Nobility of the Americas